The Carlos Palanca Memorial Awards for Literature winners in the year 1979 (rank, title of winning entry, name of author).


English division
Short story
First prize: “Arbol de Fuego” by Francisco Sionil Jose; and “Behind the Fern” by Rowena Tiempo Torrevillas
Second prize: “Act” by César Ruiz Aquino; and “The Other Woman” by Norma Miraflor
Third prize: “Another Execution” by Grace Marie Katigbak; and “Ride A White Horse to Heaven” by Antonio M. Nieva

Poetry
First prize: “Crossworks” by Cirilo F. Bautista
Second prize: “Nova Blum” by Ricardo De Ungria
Third prize: “Black Holes: A Closer View” by Edgardo B. Maranan

Essay
First prize: “This City is in the Heart” by Enrique Jose Crisostomo
Second prize: “A Scenario for Filipino Renaissance” by Francisco Sionil Jose
Third prize: “The Military As a Revolutionary Force” by Reynaldo Silvestre

One-act play
First prize: “Earthworms” by Dong Delos Reyes
Second prize: “Demigod” by Bobby Flores Villasis
Third prize: “Wedding Night” by Isagani R. Cruz

Full-length play
First prize: No winner
Second prize: No winner
Third prize: No winner
Special mention: “The Fort Santiago Contract, December 1896” by Felix A. Clemente

Filipino division
Short story
First prize: “Lagaslas ng Hanging Makamandag” by Melecio Antonio Adviento; and “Tipaklong, Tipaklong, Bakit Bulkang Sumabog ang Dibdib ni Delfin Balajadia” by Alfonso Mendoza
Second prize: “Pangarap” by Leuterio Nicolas; and “Habag” by Benigno R. Juan
Third prize: “Hindi na Babagtas ang mga Tagak” by Jose M. Marquez; and “Mga Kuwentong Kapos” by Jun Cruz Reyes

Poetry
First prize: “Kahit ka Man Hostess at Iba Pang Tula” by Alberto F. De Guzman
Second prize: “Ngayon, Ang Daigdig at Iba pang Tula” by Mar Al. Tiburcio
Third prize: “Dalawampu't Isang Tula” by Ruth Elynia S. Mabanglo

Essay
First prize: “Mga Talinhaga sa Panahon ng Krisis” by Virgilio S. Almario
Second prize: “Ang Kaisipang Pilipino Batay sa Sining Biswal” by Alice Guillermo
Third prize: “Sa Ibabaw ng Kapirasong Lupa” by Anselmo Roque

One-act play
First prize: “Bahay Kalapati” by Mateo Trijo Doctor
Second prize: “Isneg” by Manuel Galvez
Third prize: “Ang Bangkay” by Nonilon Queano

Full-length play
First prize: “Langit Ma'y Magdilim” by Bonifacio Ilagan
Second prize: “Juan Tamban” by Malou Leviste Jacob
Third prize: “Ang Katutubo” by Nonilon Queano

References
 

Palanca Awards
1979 literary awards